Hatfield Cemetery is a historic cemetery located near Newtown, Mingo County, West Virginia. The earliest burial dates to 1881, and is the grave of Ephraim Hatfield. The cemetery contains over 100 burials including Ellison Hatfield, brother of Captain Anderson "Devil Anse" Hatfield, whose killing by three sons of Randolph McCoy at an election in Pike County, Kentucky, in 1882 is generally regarded as the beginning of the famous Hatfield-McCoy Feud. It is a companion to the Hatfield Cemetery near Sarah Ann, West Virginia.

It was listed on the National Register of Historic Places in 1980.

References

External links
 

Buildings and structures completed in 1882
Buildings and structures in Mingo County, West Virginia
Cemeteries on the National Register of Historic Places in West Virginia
Hatfield family
National Register of Historic Places in Mingo County, West Virginia